is a railway station in the city of Handa, Aichi Prefecture,  Japan, operated by Meitetsu.

Lines

Station layout
Chita Handa Station has three tracks and two platforms - a western side platform (Track 3) and central island platform (Tracks 1 and 2). The station has a pedestrian overpass facilitating access to the platforms from both sides.  The station is staffed.

Platforms

Adjacent stations

Station history
Chita Handa Station was opened on April 1, 1931 as a station on the Chita Railway. The Chita Railway became part of the Meitetsu group on February 2, 1943. A new station building was completed in December 1988. In July 2006, the Tranpass system of magnetic fare cards with automatic turnstiles was implemented.

Passenger statistics
In fiscal 2018, the station was used by an average of 6029 passengers daily (boarding passengers only).

Surrounding area
Handa Commercial High School
CLACITY HANDA
former Nakano residence

See also
 List of Railway Stations in Japan

References

External links

 Official web page

Railway stations in Japan opened in 1931
Railway stations in Aichi Prefecture
Stations of Nagoya Railroad
Handa, Aichi